Glenn Frederick Ivey (born February 27, 1961) is an American politician and attorney serving as the U.S. representative for Maryland's 4th congressional district since 2023. A partner at the law firm of Ivey & Levetown, he served as the state's attorney for Prince George's County, Maryland, from 2002 to 2011. Ivey won the 2022 Democratic primary for the 4th congressional district over Donna Edwards, who previously represented the district for four terms, and then defeated the Republican nominee. According to the Cook Partisan Voting Index, his district is one of the most Democratic in the country, with an index rating of D+40.

Ivey served on Capitol Hill as chief counsel to Senate Majority Leader Tom Daschle, as counsel to U.S. Senator Paul Sarbanes during the Whitewater controversy, as chief majority counsel to the Senate Banking Committee, and on the staff of U.S. Representative John Conyers. He also worked for U.S. Attorney Eric Holder as an assistant U.S. attorney, and as chair of the Maryland Public Service Commission. He was twice elected state's attorney for Prince George's County, Maryland.

Early life and education 
Ivey was born in Chelsea, Massachusetts, but grew up in Rocky Mount, North Carolina, where much of his extended family lived and his mother worked as the first Black teacher at an all-white school. His immediate family later moved to Dale City, Virginia, after his father got a job with the United States Department of Labor. Ivey graduated with honors from Princeton University, where he earned an A.B. degree in politics in 1983. In 1986, he received a J.D. degree from Harvard Law School.

Career 
After graduating from Harvard Law School in 1986, Ivey worked for the Baltimore law firm of Gordon-Feinblatt. From 1987 to 1988, he worked on Capitol Hill as an aide to U.S. Representative John Conyers, after which he returned to law, working for Preston, Gates, Ellis & Rouvelas.

In 1989, the United States Department of Justice hired Ivey as an assistant U.S. attorney in Washington, D.C. He worked for U.S. Attorney for the District of Columbia Eric Holder. Afterward, Ivey returned to Capitol Hill to serve as majority counsel to U.S. Senate Banking Committee Chairman Donald Riegle. From 1995 to 1997, he served as the counsel for Senator Paul Sarbanes during the Senate Whitewater investigations. Eventually, Ivey served as chief counsel to Senate Democratic Leader Tom Daschle until 1998.

In March 1998, Governor Parris Glendening named Ivey to serve as chairman of the Maryland Public Service Commission. As chairman, Ivey oversaw the deregulation of Maryland's electric power industry and helped the PSC determine how to monitor telephone services and foster competition in the telecommunications industry. On October 18, 2000, Ivey announced that he would resign from the PSC by the end of the month to become a partner at the K&L Gates law firm, and said he was contemplating a 2002 run for Prince George's County State's Attorney.

Ivey ran for Prince George's County State's Attorney in 2002, seeking to succeed outgoing state's attorney Jack B. Johnson. In the primary, he was endorsed by U.S. Representative Albert Wynn, U.S. Senator Paul Sarbanes, and The Washington Post. He defeated deputy state's attorney Mark Spencer in the primary with 60.0% of the vote. He ran unopposed in the general election.

Following the end of his second term as state's attorney, Ivey became a partner at Venable LLP before moving to a position as a partner at Leftwich & Ludaway, in Washington, D.C., from 2012 to 2017. Afterward, he was a partner at the District-based law firm Price Benowitz. In 2020, Ivey opened his own law firm, Ivey & Levetown, in Greenbelt, Maryland.

Ivey taught trial advocacy at Harvard Law School during winter sessions from 2013 to 2021 and was an adjunct professor at the University of Maryland School of Law from 1995 to 2014. He is a past president of the D.C. chapter of the Harvard Law School Association, a former chair of the Maryland Legal Services Corporation, and a former member of the D.C. Bar Association's Board of Governors.

In July 2020, Prince George's County executive Angela Alsobrooks appointed Ivey to serve as the chair of the county's Police Reform Task Force. During committee meetings, Ivey scrutinized policies surrounding pretextual traffic stops, which experts say can enable racial profiling and precipitate a police shooting. The committee released its final report on December 3, which included recommendations relating to community engagement, employee hiring and retention, police department finances, internal oversight, and standards and regulations.

Ivey is a member of The Sentencing Project's Board of Directors.

Prince George's State's Attorney (2002–2011) 
Ivey ran and was elected twice as state's attorney for Prince George's County, Maryland, and served from January 2003 to January 2011. In November 2009, he declined to run for Prince George's County executive or for a third term as state's attorney, instead forming an exploratory committee to look at challenging U.S. Representative Donna Edwards in the 2010 elections. In January 2010, he decided against running for a third term or against Edwards, saying he wanted to return to the private sector after the end of his term.

When Ivey took office in December 2002, Prince George's County had the second-highest crime rate in Maryland. During his two terms as state's attorney, he oversaw reductions in crime and led reform measures that put cameras in police interrogation rooms and prosecuted officers accused of excessive force. He sought to involve community groups in crafting policies and strategies for tackling crime in the county and partnered with faith leaders to assist domestic violence survivors and to gain tougher sentences for convicted offenders.

In October 2002, following the arrest of D.C. snipers Lee Boyd Malvo and John Allen Muhammad, Ivey declined to prosecute them in his county because of their murder convictions in both Maryland and Virginia.

In July 2008, Ivey's office faced intense public scrutiny to hold someone accountable following the strangulation death of 19-year-old Ronnie White, who was accused of killing a police officer. In December, the grand jury involved in the death investigation had concluded its deliberations, determining that it had insufficient evidence to bring down indictments in the case. After a yearlong investigation, Ivey announced that there was no evidence to support murder charges against jail employees. The Department of Justice also reviewed the case and concluded that there was insufficient evidence to charge anyone with murder or manslaughter.

In August 2010, Ivey endorsed Angela Alsobrooks, the executive director of the Prince George's County Revenue Authority, to succeed him as Prince George's County State's Attorney.

U.S. House of Representatives (2023–present) 
Ivey was sworn into the United States House of Representatives on January 3, 2023, succeeding Anthony Brown.

Committee assignments 

 House Judiciary Committee
 Subcommittee on the Administrative State, Regulatory Reform, and Antitrust
 Subcommittee on Courts, Intellectual Property, and the Internet
 Subcommittee on Responsiveness and Accountability to Oversight
 House Committee on Homeland Security
 House Committee on Ethics

Caucus memberships 

 Congressional Black Caucus
 Equality Caucus
 Bipartisan HBCU Caucus
 Bipartisan Artificial Intelligence Caucus
 Caucus on Homelessness
 Black Maternal Health Caucus
 High Tech Caucus
 Pro-Choice Caucus
 New Democrat Coalition
 Second Chance Task Force
 Democratic Faith Working Group
 Substance Abuse / Mental Health Task Force
 Gun Violence Prevention Task Force
 Sustainable Energy and Environment Coalition

Elections 
2012

In October 2011, Ivey said through a spokesperson that he was considering a run for the United States House of Representatives in Maryland's 4th congressional district, challenging the incumbent, Donna Edwards. He declared his candidacy on November 3, but dropped out in January 2012, saying he could not raise enough money for his campaign.

2016

In September 2015, Ivey announced that he would again run for the House of Representatives in Maryland's 4th congressional district, seeking to succeed Edwards, who unsuccessfully ran for United States Senate in 2016.

During the primary, Ivey was endorsed by former United States Attorney General Eric Holder, Prince George's County executive Rushern Baker, state senator Victor R. Ramirez, and many municipal leaders. He also led his competitors, including former Maryland lieutenant governor Anthony Brown and state delegate Joseline Peña-Melnyk, in fundraising until the very end of the campaign.

The primary was held on April 26, 2016. Brown defeated Ivey, 41.6% to 34.0%, a margin of 8,712 votes out of 114,623 cast. Peña-Melnyk took 19.0%. Ivey worked as an attorney in private practice following his loss.

2022

On October 26, 2021, Ivey again declared his candidacy for the House of Representatives in Maryland's 4th congressional district, seeking to succeed outgoing Representative Anthony Brown, who ran for attorney general of Maryland in 2022.

During the primary, he was endorsed by The Washington Post, former Maryland governor Parris Glendening, former Prince George's County executive Rushern Baker, former Montgomery County executive Ike Leggett, and various municipal leaders. The New York Times called the race a proxy fight over Israel. The United Democracy Project, a super PAC established by the American Israel Public Affairs Committee, spent $5.9 million on Ivey's campaign, while J Street spent $720,000 on former U.S. Representative Donna Edwards's campaign. Ivey downplayed the help he received from AIPAC and its allies, telling The Post that while their support was "extremely helpful", voters in the district weren't especially concerned about Israel.

Ivey turned a 13-point deficit into a five-point lead over Edwards by early June, weeks before United Democracy Project began running TV ads on June 17.

The primary was held on July 19, 2022. Ivey defeated Edwards, 51.8% to 35.2%, a margin of 13,677 votes out of 82,662 cast. Former state delegate Angela Angel took 5.7% of the vote.

Ivey won the general election on November 8, 2022, defeating Republican nominee Jeff Warner.

Personal life 

Ivey has been married since 1988 to Jolene Ivey, a former Maryland delegate and current member of the Prince George's County Council. They have five children, including Maryland delegate Julian Ivey, and live in Cheverly, Maryland.

In February 2004, Ivey took a leave of absence of several weeks to undergo surgery to remove a bean-sized cancer tumor on his kidney. His doctors told him that the cancer was detected early and his chances of a full recovery were good. He has been cancer-free since.

Political positions

Capital punishment

When Ivey first took office as state's attorney in 2002, he said he believed in using the death penalty. He sought the death penalty several times during his tenure as state's attorney, and said in November 2007 that he filed notice of his intent to seek death in case about once a year.

In February 2009, Ivey testified before the Maryland House of Delegates' Judicial Proceedings Committee that he had had a change of heart during his time as state's attorney, particularly because of the effect the process had on victims' families. In January 2012, he called the death penalty a "political tool" and pushed for a bill that would repeal the death penalty in Maryland during the 2012 legislative session.

Environment
In July 2022, an Ivey campaign aide told Environment & Energy Publishing that Ivey supported the Green New Deal and a quick transition away from fossil fuels.

Foreign policy

Iran
Ivey opposes the Iran nuclear deal negotiated by the Obama administration in 2015. In December 2021, he said he wanted a commitment to "full and neutral inspections [of Iranian nuclear sites]" and an end to Iran's funding of Hamas and Hezbollah before the U.S. reenters the deal.

Israel
In 2006, Ivey traveled to Israel with other local elected officials on a Jewish Community Relations Council trip.

Ivey supports a two-state solution to the Israeli–Palestinian conflict and "Israel's right to exist and defend itself". In December 2021, he said he would vote to fund Israel's Iron Dome missile-defense system and opposed placing conditions on U.S. foreign aid to Israel to leverage components of negotiations about a two-state solution.

Ivey opposes the Boycott, Divestment, and Sanctions (BDS) movement against Israel.

Healthcare
Ivey supports Medicare for All and the legalization of recreational marijuana.

Police funding
During his 2022 campaign, Ivey said he would seek to tie federal police funding to departments serious about rethinking policing tactics. He also said he would be willing to work with police to fight crime while "holding accountable" officers engaged in misconduct. He does not support the "Defund the Police" movement, arguing that it damaged Democrats electorally and served as a "distraction" from real issues.

Social issues
In October 2012, Ivey appeared in an ad to support Question 6, a referendum to support the legalization of same-sex marriage in Maryland.

In November 2022, Ivey said he supported bringing the new Federal Bureau of Investigation headquarters to Prince George's County, later citing it as one of his top priorities.

Electoral history

References

External links

 Congressman Glenn Ivey official U.S. House website
Glenn Ivey for Congress campaign website

|-

1961 births
20th-century African-American people
21st-century African-American people
African-American lawyers
African-American members of the United States House of Representatives
African-American people in Maryland politics
Democratic Party members of the United States House of Representatives from Maryland
Harvard Law School alumni
Living people
Maryland Democrats
People from Chelsea, Massachusetts
People from Rocky Mount, North Carolina
People from Dale City, Virginia
People from Prince George's County, Maryland
Princeton University alumni
State's attorneys in Maryland